Shibata  (written:  lit. "brushwood, ricefield") is the 63rd most common Japanese surname. Notable people with the surname include:

, Japanese swimmer
, Japanese field hockey player
, Japanese volleyball player
, Japanese singer
, Japanese swimmer
, Japanese film director
, Japanese voice actor
, Japanese comedian
, Japanese long jumper
, Japanese singer-songwriter
Kanjuro Shibata XX (1921–2013), kyudo master and bowmaker
, Japanese samurai and military commander
Shibata Katsutoyo (1556–1583), Japanese samurai commander
, Japanese professional wrestler and mixed martial artist
, Japanese actress, singer and model
, Japanese middle-distance runner
, Japanese professional boxer
, Japanese cross-country skier
, Japanese handball player
, Japanese samurai and military commander
, Japanese photographer
, Japanese figure skater
, Japanese butterfly swimmer
, Japanese table tennis player
, Japanese chief executive
, Japanese fencer
, Japanese footballer
, Japanese footballer
, Japanese diplomat
, Japanese video game music composer and sound director
, Japanese announcer
, Japanese photographer
, Japanese poet
, Japanese film director
, Japanese jockey
, Japanese voice actress
, Japanese painter and lacquerer

References

Japanese-language surnames